Ernest Alfred Bourne (1 August 1926 – 21 January 2009) was an English Australian actor, entertainer, comedian and puppeteer, whose career locally spanned 50 years, having started his career in theatre in his native England, he became known for his regular roles in theatre and television in Australia, particularly in character roles, Bourne was probably best known locally and internationally for his role as prison chef Mervin Pringle, in the TV series Prisoner and as mechanic Rob Lewis in Neighbours

Biography 
Bourne was born in Dorset, England and raised in Yeovil, Somerset where his mother ran a boarding house following the early death of his father. Leaving school and home at the age of 14, Bourne worked in a cafe before joining the British Merchant Navy during World War II, where he became interested in acting after appearing in a pantomime, he would appear regularly in English pantomime and in many stage productions in Bristol, before migrating to Australia.

He emigrated to Australia in 1952, initially settling in Geelong joining the Geelong Musical Comedy Company, he appeared in numerous stage roles starting from 1955 and later moving to Melbourne. In the 1960s, he was loved (and booed) as a series of pantomime-style villains on Australian television such as Sir Jasper Crookley (in Magic Circle Club), and multiple similar baddies in Adventure Island including Sir Cedric Sneak, Captain Crook, Chummy Chums and Miser Meanie's sidekick Fester Fumble.

Throughout the early-to-mid 1970s he was a staple of Crawford Productions police dramas in a variety of character roles. In the 1980s he played prison chef Mervin Pringle in Prisoner (having earlier played two other minor roles) and garage mechanic Rob Lewis in Neighbours.

He also appeared in a series of television commercials for a retail sportsgear outlet (Sportsmart) as an older man (playing golf and tennis) who is perpetually laughed at by a young blonde man for spending too much money on his gear elsewhere. He has a daughter Sally Bourne who is also an actress and is best known for appearing in the musicals of Andrew Lloyd Webber.
Bourne was married to Claire Bourne (formerly Smith) and he died on 21 January 2009, aged 82, at The Alfred Hospital in Melbourne.

Filmography (selected)

External links

References

1926 births
2009 deaths
Australian male film actors
Australian male soap opera actors
English emigrants to Australia
British Merchant Navy personnel of World War II
Male actors from Dorset
People from Yeovil
20th-century Australian male actors
21st-century Australian male actors
Military personnel from Somerset